The Hanged Man is a 1974 American Western television film directed by Michael Caffey and starring Steve Forrest, Cameron Mitchell and Sharon Acker. It premiered on ABC on March 13, 1974, and was intended as a pilot for a possible new series which was never produced.

Plot
Having survived his own hanging, hired killer James Devlin turns over a new leaf, defending a widow and her son from an avaricious land baron.

Cast
 Steve Forrest as James Devlin 
 Dean Jagger as Josiah Lowe
 Will Geer as Nameless
 Sharon Acker as Carrie Gault
 Brendon Boone as Billy Irons
 Rafael Campos as Father Alvaro
 Barbara Luna as Soledad Villegas
 Cameron Mitchell as Lew Halleck
 Ray Teal as Judge Homer Bayne
 Bobby Eilbacher as Benjamin Gault
 William Bryant as Dr. Lawrence Nye
 Steve Marlo as Joe "Patch" Janney
 John Mitchum as Eubie Turpin
 Michael Masters as Deputy Sheriff
 Bill Catching as Executioner

See also
 List of American films of 1974
 The Hanged Man (tarot card)

References

External links
 
 

1974 television films
1970s English-language films
ABC Movie of the Week
American Western (genre) television films
Films scored by Richard Markowitz
Television pilots not picked up as a series